General elections were held in Trinidad and Tobago on 4 December 1961. The result was a victory for the People's National Movement, which won 20 of the 30 seats. Voter turnout was 88.1%.

Results

References

Trinidad and Tobago
Elections in Trinidad and Tobago
1961 in Trinidad and Tobago